Brain Donors is a 1992 American comedy film directed by Dennis Dugan and released by Paramount Pictures, loosely based on the Marx Brothers comedies A Night at the Opera and A Day at the Races (the first two films the Marx Brothers made for Metro-Goldwyn-Mayer after leaving Paramount). The film co-stars John Turturro, Mel Smith, and Bob Nelson in the approximations of the Groucho, Chico, and Harpo roles, with Nancy Marchand in the Margaret Dumont dowager role. It was executive produced by David and Jerry Zucker, through their Zucker Brothers Productions.

Plot 

After the death of tycoon and philanthropist Oscar Winterhaven Oglethorpe, a ballet company is founded in his name by his widow, Lillian. Ambulance-chasing attorney Roland T. Flakfizer competes against Oglethorpe's former attorney, Edmund Lazlo, to be director of the company. Lazlo is chosen for the position after signing the greatest ballet dancer in the world, Roberto "The Great” Volare. Flakfizer — with assistance from his two associates Rocco and Jacques — earns a spot as co-director by wooing the wealthy widow and by signing the company's leading ballerina and her dancer boyfriend Alan Grant. The ensuing struggle between Flakfizer and Lazlo leads to comic hijinks, including a badger game involving a chorus girl and an opening-night performance ludicrously sabotaged by Flakfizer and his cohorts.

Cast and characters 
John Turturro as Roland T. Flakfizer
Bob Nelson as Jacques
Mel Smith as Rocco Melonchek
George de la Peña as Roberto “the Great” Volare
John Savident as Edmund Lazlo
Nancy Marchand as Lillian Oglethorpe
Juliana Donald as Lisa LeBaron
Spike Alexander as Alan Grant
Teri Copley as Tina

Minor roles include Eddie Griffin as a messenger, Franklin Cover as a doctor, Thomas Mikal Ford and Matthew Sussman as cops, Katherine LaNasa as a dancer, Billy Beck as a janitor, Sam Krachmalnick as a conductor, and Max Alexander as a stage manager.

Production
Dennis Dugan began work on the film shortly after screening a rough cut of his film Problem Child for David Zucker. Soon after meeting to compare notes, Zucker sent Dugan a script by Pat Proft, and work began on the project in earnest. Initially, Proft was to be a co-producer and frequent Zucker brothers collaborator Jim Abrahams was to be a co-writer, but Abrahams was ultimately not credited as a screenwriter. Principal photography began on December 10, 1990, and the film was largely shot in and around Los Angeles. Portions of the film were shot at the Morton Estate, in Pasadena, California, which was also the location where the Marx Brothers' Duck Soup was shot. The project was filmed under the title Lame Ducks, but Paramount later changed the title to Brain Donors because it was "catchier", according to sources consulted by the Los Angeles Times.

Dugan originally sought to cast Adam Sandler in the film, but the studio did not agree to it; however, this established a rapport with Sandler that led to Dugan directing several films with him. Mickey Gilbert was the stunt coordinator, and Max Balchowsky was among the stuntmen involved in production. The opening credits and closing scene of the film are claymation sequences designed by Will Vinton. The film is scored by Ira Newborn; Mark Mothersbaugh contributed the main and end titles and additional music.

Initially scheduled for release on July 26, 1991, the film was pushed back without a reschedule date; multiple news reports noted the imminent departure of David and Jerry Zucker, whose contract with Paramount expired in August 1991, as a likely reason. Turturro was also frustrated with the project, according to a report from the Chicago Tribune. Brain Donors eventually opened in theaters nine months after the original schedule date, on April 17, 1992. The Los Angeles Times remarked that the studio's handling of the film resembled "dumping", despite the high profile of the films that the screenwriter and executive producers had worked on (such as the Naked Gun and Hot Shots! franchises); the film was not screened for critics, was given minimal publicity support, and only opened in 523 American theaters.

Reception 
Contemporaneous reviews of the film were mixed. Positive reviewers included Mick LaSalle of the San Francisco Chronicle, who thought that the film was "an audacious attempt actually to make them like they used to - with no apologies, no nostalgia. It's no masterpiece, but neither was every Marx Brothers movie." In her review for The New York Times, Janet Maslin wrote, "Brain Donors will stop at very little to get its laughs, and Mr. Turturro has just the right silliness for the occasion."  A positive review in the South Florida Sun-Sentinel noted, "It doesn't have one believable, well-rounded character, it doesn't appeal to our nobler emotions, and it doesn't have anything politically correct to say about any important social problems. These seeming faults, however, are exactly the qualities that make it the most hilarious film yet this year."

Other reviews were less enthusiastic, especially in comparison to the original Marx Brothers films and to the prior films on which the Zucker brothers had worked. Richard Harrington in his review for The Washington Post wrote, "It's all very busy, and in Zucker style there seem to be 10 jokes per minute, but most fly fast and fall flat." Pamela Bruce, writing for the Austin Chronicle, believed the film was too derivative of the Marx Brothers and the Three Stooges, and thought the claymation sequences that bookend the film were more interesting than the actual movie itself.  The Los Angeles Daily News described it as "Impudent and manic, yes, in the best Marxian tradition. But it is desperate in its scattered shots at any lame thing for a possible laugh, where the Marxes were always cool and -- for the most part -- surreally inspired when it came to stringing nonsense together." Malcolm Johnson of the Hartford Courant called it a "sometimes clever but ultimately exhausting farce" and noted perplexedly that its title had nothing to do with its subject matter. Variety gave a negative review, remarking, "The title Brain Donors sounds like a horror film and for those expecting a comedy, it is." Entertainment Weekly called it "an almost total failure" and thought "the cheesy sets and breathless pacing give the film the feel of a made-for-TV movie on amphetamines."

A 2005 reevaluation of screenwriter Pat Proft's work wrote approvingly of Brain Donors, remarking, "as a throwback to the Marx/Ritz Brothers ideal of Hellzapoppin' humor, it tried to recapture the bygone days of slapstick and satire, and actually did a terrific job at both."

References

External links
 
 
 
 
The Marx Brothers Council Podcast tribute to "Brian Donors" with guests David Zucker and Pat Proft

1990s buddy comedy films
1990s English-language films
1992 comedy films
1992 films
American buddy comedy films
Cultural depictions of the Marx Brothers
Films directed by Dennis Dugan
Films scored by Ira Newborn
Films with screenplays by Pat Proft
Paramount Pictures films
1990s American films